Puya clava-herculis is a species of plants in the genus Puya. This species is native to Ecuador.

References

clava-herculis
Flora of Ecuador
Páramo flora